A possessory credit in filmmaking is the use of a film credit which gives primary artistic recognition to a single person, usually (but not always) the film's director. Examples include "A Stanley Kubrick film" (The Shining), "A film by Quentin Tarantino" (Pulp Fiction), and "Alfred Hitchcock's Psycho" (Psycho). Possessory credit is also sometimes used in television programs; for example, Tyler Perry's House of Payne (Tyler Perry's TBS sitcom House of Payne). Occasionally another word besides "film" is used, such as "A Spike Lee Joint" or "A Martin Scorsese Picture". Possessory credit may also be given to the producer; an example of this is "Steven Spielberg presents Back to the Future".

Although the earliest use of possessory credit dates from 1915's The Birth of a Nation, the use of possessory credits expanded particularly in the 1970s and 1980s. The Writers Guild of America (WGA) has repeatedly tried to limit possessory credits to writers but has always been successfully opposed by the Directors Guild of America (DGA), leaving directors free to try to negotiate such credits if they wish.

Sometimes the possessory credit  goes to the author of the novel on which the film was based  (such as "Bram Stoker's Dracula," "William Shakespeare's Romeo + Juliet" and some Stephen King films). In the case of Tim Burton's The Nightmare Before Christmas, Burton was not the film's director but instead the writer, producer, and a major creative voice. This may also be an example of a possessory credit being chosen for marketing reasons, as Burton was a more recognized name than the film's director, Henry Selick.

The DGA encourages filmmakers to use restraint in taking credit until they have attained widespread name recognition or received at least two established awards of merit for their films, thereby securing their legacies as filmmakers.

Video games 
Possessory credits are sometimes used for video games such as American McGee's Alice, Sid Meier's Civilization, games released by Tom Clancy's Red Storm Entertainment, and games in Hideo Kojima's Metal Gear series.

They are also used when celebrities have licensed their names for use in games, or are involved with the game's development—for example, Mike Tyson's Punch-Out!!, and skater Tony Hawk's various games.

References

Sources
 Paul A Baumgarten; Donald C Farber; Mark Fleischer (2002). Producing, financing and distributing film: New York : Limelight Editions, 2002.  pp 190

Film and video terminology